Taepyeongno is a major thoroughfare in the central districts of Seoul, South Korea and the second longest road next to Sejongno in the Gangbuk area. With a 1.1 km length and a 50 m width, Taepyeongno originates at 139 Sejongno in Jongno-gu and terminates at Namdaemun in Jung-gu.  It runs southwards through Sogong-dong, Jeong-dong, Taepyeongno 1, 2 ga-dong, Bukchang-dong and Mugyo-dong. Numerous landmarks along here include Koreana Hotel.

Gallery

See also
Sejongno/Gwanghwamun Plaza
Seoul Plaza
Seoul City Hall
Seoul Metropolitan Library
Namdaemun

References

Streets in Seoul
Neighbourhoods of Jung-gu, Seoul

ko:태평로 (서울)